The Sanxia Old Street is centered on Minquan Street in Sanxia District, New Taipei, Taiwan.

History
A renovation work was carried out starting in 2004 and completed in 2007 to restore the buildings along the street to their early 20th century style. It also includes the establishment of the management committee of the old street.

Architecture
The street spans over a length of 200 meters. Buildings along the street are the baroque-style architecture built during Japanese rule. Zushi Temple is located at one end of the street.

See also
 List of roads in Taiwan
 List of tourist attractions in Taiwan

References

Streets in Taiwan
Transportation in New Taipei